Vladimir Drazhev (born 22 June 1954) is a Bulgarian alpine skier. He competed in the men's giant slalom at the 1976 Winter Olympics.

References

1954 births
Living people
Bulgarian male alpine skiers
Olympic alpine skiers of Bulgaria
Alpine skiers at the 1976 Winter Olympics
Place of birth missing (living people)